Manganese silicide may refer to the following chemical compounds:

Manganese monosilicide, 
Manganese disilicide, 
Mavlyanovite,